The Battle of Satara was fought between the Mughal Empire and Maratha Empire between 1699–1700. The battle started when the Mughal Emperor Aurangzeb personally marched towards Satara, accompanied by 10,000 Mughal soldiers. He aimed to finally capture Satara, the center of the Maratha realm. The Mughal Emperor Aurangzeb then ordered for an attack on the fort of Satara. The Mughals destroyed major parts of the fortress and many of the other Mughal Forces surrounded and marched towards the further Maratha forts. Seeing this, the Maratha commander Dhanaji Jadhav finally surrendered the Satara fort on 21 April 1700, and rushed to protect the further Maratha Forts to which Mughal forces marched and surrounded. The Mughals captured the Satara fort and the battle was a huge loss for the Marathas.

References

Satara
Satara
1700 in India
Satara (city)